Nhân Trạch is a commune (xã) and village in Bố Trạch District, Quảng Bình Province, in the North Central Coast region of Vietnam.

Populated places in Quảng Bình province
Communes of Quảng Bình province